Lotta Hintsa (known as Lotta Näkyvä from 2016 to 2019, born 14 December 1988) is a Finnish model and beauty pageant titleholder who was crowned Miss Finland 2013.

Early life
Hintsa studied at University of Jyväskylä. She worked at Bianco Footwear (Store Manager) in Finland. Her father, Aki Hintsa, was a doctor in McLaren F1 team. In April 2013 she revealed that she had been in good relations with Formula One driver Lewis Hamilton around six years ago, but denied that the two had ever dated.

Miss Finland 2013
Hintsa was crowned Miss Finland 2013 during the annual event held at the Långvik Congress Wellness Hotel in Kirkkonummi on 5 May. Standing 1.68 m tall, Hintsa represented Finland during the 2013 Miss Universe pageant on 9 November. The runners-up competed at the Miss World 2013 and Miss International 2013.

Other appearances
In autumn 2018, Näkyvä competed in Dances with Stars, the Finnish version of the dance contest Strictly Come Dancing.

Personal life 
Hintsa married ice hockey player Kristian Näkyvä in 2016, taking his last name; the couple announced their divorce in 2019.

References

External links
Official Miss Suomi website

1988 births
Living people
People from Seinäjoki
Miss Finland winners
Miss Universe 2013 contestants